Hevein was a Finnish thrash metal band from Helsinki with symphonic metal and neo-classical metal influences.

History
Hevein's roots go back to 1992 when guitarist Leif Hedstrom and former drummer Alpo Oksaharju started jamming together. In 1998, bassist Tomi Koivunen and violinist Aino Piipari joined the band. In 2002, cellist Max Lilja left Apocalyptica and joined Hevein. In 2003, Hevein officially started their career when vocalist Juha Immonen joined the band.

Debut album Sound Over Matter
In 2005, Hevein signed to Finnish indie label Spinefarm Records and released their debut album, Sound Over Matter. The album received a worldwide release via Universal Records and Candlelight Records in the USA.

Hevein's tour of the album was limited to a few shows in Finland, Russia, the Netherlands, Belgium, Germany and a small tour in the Czech Republic.

Hevein released two singles and one music video that they wrote and directed themselves and the album mainly generated positive feedback from music critics.

Unfinished album Gentle Anarchy
Soon after Hevein released their debut album they set to work on writing new material for their second album Gentle Anarchy. From 2006 to 2008 the band wrote and demoed a plethora of music that did not suit the label they were signed to. In 2008, Hevein parted ways with Spinefarm Records and decided to continue writing and demoing material. With over 40 songs written and no interest from any label, Hevein decided to finance the recording of four songs for the album. On 8 January 2012, after producing a few more demos they released four new songs as a digital download via their Bandcamp website. The revenue generated from the sale of the songs enabled them to record drums for five more songs. However, due to support drying up on their Bandcamp site, the global recession and the state of the music industry, Hevein decided to disband in September 2012 before they could finish the album.

Name
According to Leif Hedstrom, the guitarist once heard a Hüsker Dü song, covered by Blackstar, titled "The Girl Who Lives on Heaven Hill". Hereupon, the words "Heaven Hill" were changed into "Heven Hill" and were altered again until the name "Hevein" was born. Hevein is also a Finnish word play for "the heavy-est" (in reference to heavy metal).

Members
 Juha Immonen – vocals
 Leif Hedstrom – guitar, vocals
 Janne Jaakkola – bass
 Toni Paananen – drums
 Aino Piipari – violin
 Max Lilja – cello

Former members
 Dimitri Paile – vocals
 Tomi Koivunen – bass
 Alpo Oksaharju – drums
 Otto Uotila – drums

Discography

Studio albums
 Sound Over Matter (2005)

Singles, EPs and digital releases
 iOta (2005)
 As Far As The Eye Can See (2005)
 Gentle Anarchy EP (digital release; 2010)

Demos
 Heartland (1999)
 Reverence (2001)
 Only Human (2002)
 Fear Is... Only Human (2003)
 Break Out The Hammers EP (2004)

Covers
 Pantera's "Walk", featured on the "As Far As the Eye Can See" single
 Anathema's "Empty", which they played live a few times
 Pantera's "Use My Third Arm", played live at Metal Barbecue concert and a Dimebag Darrell memorial concert
 At the Gates, "Cold"

Music videos
 "Last Drop of Innocence" (2005)
 "New Hope" (2010)
 "Nor" (2011)

External links

 
 http://hevein.bandcamp.com/

Musical groups established in 1992
Musical groups disestablished in 2012
1992 establishments in Finland
2012 disestablishments in Finland
Finnish heavy metal musical groups
Finnish thrash metal musical groups
Finnish symphonic metal musical groups
Musical groups from Helsinki